Leo C. Mundy (June 2, 1887 – June 11, 1944) was an American physician and politician who served as a Democratic member of the Pennsylvania Senate for the 21st district from 1939 to 1944.

Early life and education
Mundy was born in Wilkes-Barre, Pennsylvania.  He attended the public schools and Wyoming Seminary.  He received his medical degree from the University of Pennsylvania in 1908.

Mundy served in the United States Army as a captain during World War I. He was placed in charge of a one-thousand-bed military hospital in France.  In 1919, he was brevetted lieutenant-colonel and received the distinguished service citation from General John Pershing for heroism in treating and evacuating wounded soldiers under fire.

Career
After the war, Mundy resumed his medical practice and entered politics by directing the campaign of his brother for city council.  He became the chair of the Luzerne County Democratic Committee which gave him control over patronage jobs.  In 1932, he was a delegate to the Chicago Democratic Convention and actively supported the nomination of Franklin Delano Roosevelt.  As a reward for that support, he was appointed collector of internal revenue for the Middle District of Pennsylvania.

Mundy served in the Pennsylvania State Senate for the 21st district from 1939 until his death in 1944.

He died on June 11, 1944 in a hospital in Wilkes-Barre, Pennsylvania after suffering a heart attack and is interred at Saint Mary's Cemetery in Hanover Township, Pennsylvania.

Notes

1887 births
1944 deaths
20th-century American physicians
20th-century American politicians
United States Army personnel of World War I
Burials in Pennsylvania
Military personnel from Pennsylvania
Democratic Party Pennsylvania state senators
Perelman School of Medicine at the University of Pennsylvania alumni
Physicians from Pennsylvania
Politicians from Wilkes-Barre, Pennsylvania
Wyoming Seminary alumni